Tamroy was a company-owned mining town in Raleigh County, West Virginia. It was owned by McKell Coal & Coke Company.

References 

Unincorporated communities in West Virginia
Unincorporated communities in Raleigh County, West Virginia
Coal towns in West Virginia